Desmond Murray Dunnet (20 August 1913 – 24 February 1980) was a New Zealand cricketer. He played first-class cricket for Canterbury and Otago between 1942 and 1951.

Dunnet was born at Christchurch in 1913 and educated at St Andrew's College, Christchurch. He died in England in 1980; an obituary was published in that year's New Zealand Cricket Annual.

References

External links
 

1913 births
1980 deaths
New Zealand cricketers
Canterbury cricketers
Otago cricketers
Cricketers from Christchurch
New Zealand Army cricketers
South Island Army cricketers
New Zealand Services cricketers